Powder River County is a county in the U.S. state of Montana. As of the 2020 census, the population was 1,694. Its county seat is Broadus.

History
Powder River County's area was probably first entered by Europeans when French trappers worked its streams in the early 1800s. In 1865 the federal government sent soldiers (Powder River Expedition) to the Powder River country to combat Native Americans from the Cheyenne, Lakota Sioux, and Arapaho tribes. September 1865 saw several skirmishes (Powder River Battles) near present-day Broadus.

Powderville was the area's first established settlement; it began operating on November 1, 1878, as the Powder River Telegraph Station on a line connecting Fort Keogh to Deadwood, South Dakota. On April 5, 1879, the Mizpah Creek Incidents began near the Powderville telegraph station.

Custer County was organized in early 1877, consisting of most of SE Montana Territory. In February 1900, the Broadus Post Office opened. In October 1918 the first edition of the area's first newspaper appeared. On March 17, 1919, Powder River County was formed from southern Custer County. In a 1920 election, Broadus was chosen as the county seat.

Geography

Major highways
  U.S. Highway 212
  Montana Highway 59

Adjacent counties

 Custer County - north
 Carter County - east
 Crook County, Wyoming - southeast
 Campbell County, Wyoming - south
 Sheridan County, Wyoming - southwest
 Big Horn County - west
 Rosebud County - northwest

National protected area
 Custer National Forest (part)

Demographics

2000 census
As of the 2000 census, there were 1,858 people, 737 households, and 524 families in the county. The population density was <1/km2 (<1/sq mi). There were 1,007 housing units at an average density of <1/km2 (<1/sq mi). The racial makeup of the county was 97.42% White, 1.78% Native American, 0.11% Asian, 0.22% from other races, and 0.48% from two or more races. 0.59% of the population were Hispanic or Latino of any race. 33.2% were of German, 13.8% English, 10.7% Irish and 5.9% Norwegian ancestry.

There were 737 households, out of which 30.70% had children under the age of 18 living with them, 64.90% were married couples living together, 4.10% had a female householder with no husband present, and 28.80% were non-families. 24.80% of all households were made up of individuals, and 9.90% had someone living alone who was 65 years of age or older. The average household size was 2.48 and the average family size was 2.99.

The county population contained 26.60% under the age of 18, 4.80% from 18 to 24, 23.30% from 25 to 44, 26.80% from 45 to 64, and 18.50% who were 65 years of age or older. The median age was 42 years. For every 100 females there were 97.20 males. For every 100 females age 18 and over, there were 95.40 males.

The median income for a household in the county was $28,398, and the median income for a family was $34,671. Males had a median income of $23,971 versus $17,411 for females. The per capita income for the county was $15,351.  About 9.90% of families and 12.90% of the population were below the poverty line, including 12.70% of those under age 18 and 16.30% of those age 65 or over.

2010 census
In the 2010 census, there were 1,743 people, 755 households, and 505 families in the county. The racial makeup of the county was 95.0% white, 1.5% American Indian, 0.2% Asian, 0.1% black or African American, 1.1% from other races, and 2.1% from two or more races. Those of Hispanic or Latino origin made up 1.4% of the population. In terms of ancestry, 34.6% were German, 31.0% were American, 15.1% were English, 14.0% were Irish, and 8.6% were Norwegian.

Of the 755 households, 26.5% had children under the age of 18 living with them, 58.1% were married couples living together, 5.0% had a female householder with no husband present, 33.1% were non-families, and 28.3% of all households were made up of individuals. The average household size was 2.26 and the average family size was 2.76. The median age was 49.3 years.

The median income for a household in the county was $37,685 and the median income for a family was $50,156. Males had a median income of $27,721 versus $26,250 for females. The per capita income for the county was $21,543. About 11.6% of families and 14.1% of the population were below the poverty line, including 15.7% of those under age 18 and 11.7% of those age 65 or over.

Politics
Powder River County is heavily Republican; it has voted Republican in every presidential election since 1940.

Communities

Town
 Broadus (county seat)

Census-designated place
 Biddle

Unincorporated communities

 Bay Horse
 Belle Creek
 Cameron Crossing
 Coalwood
 Elkhorn Crossing
 Epsie
 Moorhead
 Olive
 Otter
 Powderville
 Sayle
 Sonnette
 Willow Crossing

Notable people
 Lee Randall, Republican member of the Montana House of Representatives (2009–2017)
 Jess Lockwood, 2017 and 2019 PBR World champion
 Ronnie Rossen, World Champion PRCA Bull rider (1961, 1966)
 Jason Evans, six-time National Steer Roping Finals qualifier

See also
 Fort Howes
 List of lakes in Powder River County, Montana
 List of mountains in Powder River County, Montana
 National Register of Historic Places listings in Powder River County MT

References

 
1919 establishments in Montana
Populated places established in 1919